Giovanni Myra or Giovanni Mira (died 1600) was a Roman Catholic prelate who served as Archbishop of Acerenza e Matera (1596–1600)
and Bishop of Castellammare di Stabia (1591–1596).

Biography
On 13 September 1591, Giovanni Myra was appointed during the papacy of Pope Gregory XIV as Bishop of Castellammare di Stabia. 
On 11 March 1596, he was appointed during the papacy of Pope Clement VIII as Archbishop of Acerenza e Matera.
He served as Archbishop of Acerenza e Matera until his death in 1600.

References

External links and additional sources
 (for Chronology of Bishops) 
 (for Chronology of Bishops) 
 (for Chronology of Bishops) 
 (for Chronology of Bishops 

16th-century Italian Roman Catholic bishops
17th-century Italian Roman Catholic bishops
Bishops appointed by Pope Gregory XIV
Bishops appointed by Pope Clement VIII
1600 deaths